Moorrege, located  north west of Hamburg at the small river Pinnau, close to the Elbe river, is a municipality in the district of Pinneberg, in Schleswig-Holstein, Germany.

Moorrege is the seat of the Amt ("collective municipality") Geest und Marsch Südholstein.

The municipality is known as the birthplace of purported Nazi-resister August Landmesser.

References

External links
Moorreger SV

Pinneberg (district)